Gade is a famous surname. Notable people with the surname include:

 Fredrik Georg Gade (businessman) (1830-1905), Norwegian businessman
 Fredrik Georg Gade (1855-1933), Norwegian physician
 Fredrik Herman Gade (1871-1943), Norwegian diplomat
 Herman Gerhard Gade (1870-1953), Norwegian physician
 John Allyne Gade (1875-1955), American architect, naval officer, diplomat and author
 Ludvig Gade (1823-1897), Danish dancer and mime
 Niels Wilhelm Gade (1817-1890), Danish composer and musician
 Jacob Gade (1897-1963), Danish violinist and composer of Tango Jalousie
 Peter Gade (born 1976), Danish badminton player
 Per Gade (born 1977), Danish footballer
 Mary Gade, director of the Illinois Environmental Protection Agency from 1991 to 1999, and plaintiff in Gade v. National Solid Wastes Mgt. Ass'n

Surnames from given names